Kampong Makassar was one several internment camps in the island of Java near Batavia (present-day Jakarta) in which the Japanese interned enemy civilians, mostly Dutch, after the Dutch East Indies fell to Japanese forces in 1942. Between January to October 1945, Kampong Makassar functioned as prisoners of war, civilian, and relief camps respectively.

References 

Japanese prisoner of war and internment camps